The Reñihué River is a river in the Palena Province of the Los Lagos Region in Chile.

Pumalín Park
The river flows through Pumalín Park, a privately owned and publicly accessible nature reserve owned by The Conservation Land Trust. In 1991, Douglas Tompkins, an American leader of The Conservation Land Trust who was an  environmentalist, conservationist and a former businessman, bought a large, semi-abandoned plot of land in the Reñihué River Valley of the Chilean province of Palena.

See also
List of rivers of Chile

References

 EVALUACION DE LOS RECURSOS HIDRICOS SUPERFICIALES EN LA CUENCA DEL RIO BIO BIO

Rivers of Chile
Rivers of Los Lagos Region